The State Commission on Maritime Accident Investigation (Państwowa Komisja Badania Wypadków Morskich, PKBWM) is an agency of the Polish government that investigates maritime accidents. It is headquartered in Warsaw.

It was established in accordance with the 23 April 2009 European Parliament and Council Directive 2009/18/EC.

See also
 State Commission on Aircraft Accidents Investigation
 Committee for Investigation of National Aviation Accidents

References

External links
 Polish transport commission 
 Reports from the PKBWM
 PKBWM – Państwowa Komisja Badania Wypadków Morskich 

Government agencies of Poland
Water transport in Poland
Poland
Transport organisations based in Poland